Noor Jahan may refer to:

People
 Nur Jahan (1577–1645), Mughal empress
 Noor Jehan (1926–2000), Pakistani singer and actress
 Nurjahan Murshid (1924–2003), Bangladeshi minister
 Nurjahan Begum (1925–2016), Bangladeshi journalist
 Noor Jehan Panezai (died 2014), Pakistani politician

Other uses
 Noor Jehan (film), a 1967 Bollywood film
 Noorjahan (TV series), an Indian series aired 2000-01
 Noor Jahaan, a 2018 Indo-Bangla film